Bergemann is a surname of German origin, being a variant of the surname Bergmann, which originated as a topographic surname for a mountain dweller. Notable people with the surname include:

Carsten Bergemann (born 1979), German track cyclist
Dirk Bergemann, American professor
Frank Bergemann (born 1956), German handball coach
Sibylle Bergemann (1941-2010), German photographer

See also
Bergmann
Bergman